Kenneth Francis Schaffner (born October 30, 1939) is an emeritus Distinguished University Professor, University Professor of Philosophy and Psychology, and Professor of Psychiatry at the University of Pittsburgh. He specializes in the history and philosophy of science.

Education
His formal education consists of:
 BS, Physics and Philosophy, Brooklyn College, 1961
 PhD, Philosophy, Columbia University, 1967
 MD, University of Pittsburgh, 1986

Career
Schaffner is a philosopher and medical doctor who specializes in the history and philosophy of science. He has published extensively on ethical and conceptual issues, and has written several books in those fields. He is a Distinguished University Professor at the University of Pittsburgh, but has also taught since 1962 at Brooklyn College, the University of Chicago, the University of Maryland, and George Washington University, where he is a professor emeritus and was formerly University Professor of Medical Humanities and Professor of Philosophy. His recent work has been on ethical and philosophical issues in human behavior. He was editor-in-chief of the academic journal Philosophy of Science from 1975 to 1980.

Honors
Schaffner was a Guggenheim Fellow and has received many academic honors, including:
 Fellow, American Association for the Advancement of Science, 1986
 Fellow, The Hastings Center, 1991
 Fellow, Association for the Advancement of Philosophy and Psychiatry, 1992

Selected publications
Schaffner had been writing books for over forty years, and papers for over fifty. His books and some of his recent papers are listed below:

Books
 Nineteenth-Century Aether Theories, Oxford, Pergamon Press, 1972
 Logic of Discovery and Diagnosis in Medicine, K. Schaffner (ed.) Berkeley: University of California Press, 1985
 Medical Innovation and Bad Outcomes: Legal, Social, and Ethical Responses, M. Siegler, S. Toulmin, F. Zimring and K. Schaffner (eds.) Health Administration Press, Michigan, 1987
 Discovery and Explanation in Biology and Medicine, University of Chicago Press, 1993
 Behaving: What's Genetic, What's Not, and Why Should We Care, Oxford University Press, 2016

Chapters
 "Theories, Models, and Equations in Systems Biology", in F. Boogerd, et al. (eds) Towards a Philosophy of Systems Biology, Netherlands: Elsevier, 2007. Pages 145-162.
 Schaffner, K.F. (2008) "Etiological Models in Psychiatry: Reductive and Nonreductive" in K. Kendler and Josef Parnas (eds.) Baltimore: Johns Hopkins University Press. 2008. pp. 48–90.
 Schaffner, K.F. (2008) "A Tail of a Tiger, Comment: on Zachar's "Real Kinds but No True Taxonomy: An Essay in Psychiatric Systematics.," in K. Kendler and Josef Parnas (eds.) Baltimore: Johns Hopkins University Press. 2008. pp. 355–367.
 Schaffner, K.F. "Theories, Models, and Equations in Biology: The Heuristic Search for Emergent Simplifications in Neurobiology" Philosophy of Science, Proceedings of Vancouver Philosophy of Science Association biennial meeting, 2008. 75 (2008), 1008-1021.
 Schaffner, K.F. "Philosophy of Method," a revision of an earlier encyclopedia essay on "Method, Philosophy of," Encyclopedia of Microbiology, 3rd edition, M. Schaechter (ed.) Elsevier, 2009.
 "The validity of psychiatric diagnosis: Etiopathogenic and clinical approaches," in Psychiatric Diagnosis: Challenges and Prospects, I. Salloum and J. Mezzich (eds.) London: Wylie, 2009. pp. 221–232

Papers
 "Medical Informatics and the Concept of Disease", Theoretical Medicine and Bioethics 21: 85–101: 2000.
 "Behavior at the Organismal and Molecular Levels: The Case of C. elegans", Philosophy of Science 67 2000([PSA 1998] Proceedings): S273-S288.
 "Preventing severe mental illnesses--new prospects and ethical challenges", with Patrick D. McGorry. Schizophrenia Research Aug 1 2001; 51(1): 3–15.
 "Nature and Nurture" Current Opinion in Psychiatry, September, 2001: 14: 486–490.
 "Genes, Concepts, DST Implications, and the Possibility of Prototypes: Comments on Stotz and Griffiths, Burian, and Walters", History and Philosophy of the Life Sciences, 2004;26(1):81-90.
 "Reduction: The Cheshire Cat Problem and a Return to Roots", Synthese, Volume 151, Number 3 / August, 2006. Pages 377-402.

References

External links
 Hour-long interview of him, about his work.

Living people
Brooklyn College alumni
Columbia University alumni
University of Pittsburgh School of Medicine alumni
University of Pittsburgh faculty
Philosophers of science
21st-century American philosophers
Fellows of the American Association for the Advancement of Science
1939 births
Historians of science
21st-century American historians
21st-century American male writers
Philosophers from New York (state)
Hastings Center Fellows
George Washington University faculty
Philosophy journal editors
American male non-fiction writers